Hugh Peery (November 7, 1931 – January 10, 2015) was an American wrestler. He won a gold medal at the 1951 Pan American Games, and he competed in the men's freestyle flyweight at the 1952 Summer Olympics. He also worked as a dentist for more than 50 years.

Biography
Peery was born in Stillwater, Oklahoma in 1931. He attended the Tulsa Central High School, where he became an Eagle Scout and a two-time state champion. At the University of Pittsburgh he was a three-time NCAA champion in the early 1950s. At the 1951 Pan American Games, Peery won the gold medal in the freestyle flyweight division.

Peery was selected to represent the United States at the 1952 Summer Olympics in Helsinki. At the Olympics, Peery competed in the men's freestyle flyweight event, and was eliminated by Georgy Sayadov of the Soviet Union.

Following his wrestling career, Peery graduated from a dental school in 1956, going on to serve in the United States Navy Dental Corps. Following his military career, he returned to Pittsburgh, where he worked as a dentist for more than 50 years.

In 1980, he was inducted into the National Wrestling Hall of Fame, and he was also posthumously inducted into the University of Pittsburgh hall of fame. His brother, Ed, and his father, Rex, were also inducted into the National Wrestling Hall of Fame.

References

External links
 

1931 births
2015 deaths
American male sport wrestlers
Olympic wrestlers of the United States
Wrestlers at the 1952 Summer Olympics
People from Stillwater, Oklahoma
Wrestlers at the 1951 Pan American Games
Pan American Games gold medalists for the United States
Pan American Games medalists in wrestling
Medalists at the 1951 Pan American Games